VEB Typoart was the only type foundry of East Germany. It was a state-owned enterprise ("Volkseigener Betrieb") located in Dresden. The foundry's most influential art directors were Herbert Thannhäuser (until 1963) and Albert Kapr (until 1987).

History

VEB Typoart was created by the government of the German Democratic Republic in 1948 through a merger of several nationalised type foundries, including Schelter & Giesecke (1945), Schriftguss AG (1951), Ludwig Wagner AG (1961), and Norddeutsche Schriftgießerei (1961). Originally called Schriftguß KG Dresden (1945) and VEB Schriftguß Dresden (1958), the enterprise was renamed to VEB Typoart in 1951.

From 1970, it was subordinated to Zentrag, a state enterprise coordinating all GDR printing activity. Typoart's principal mission was to create typefaces for Eastern Germany and other Eastern Bloc countries. It was frequently ordered to plagiarise Western typefaces that Zentrag could not afford to license.

In the course of German reunification, Typoart was privatised as Typoart GmbH in 1990 and went bankrupt in 1995 after a negotiated sale to Compugraphic fell through. Many of Typoart's fonts and other works were lost at this time, including original matrices of Tschichold's type Saskia, although employees managed to save some matrices, original drawings and digital data. After this, the copyright status of Typoart's typefaces remained uncertain. Some have been reissued in digital form by other type foundries, mostly by Elsner & Flake. Some of Typoart's matrices are preserved at the Museum für Druckkunst Leipzig.

Typefaces
Typoart's typefaces included:

References

 
 Myfonts.com entry for VEB Typoart

External links

 Typowiki entry for VEB Typoart (with a full list of typefaces)
 Typoart-Freunde

Letterpress font foundries of Germany
Cold type foundries
Volkseigene Betriebe
Design companies established in 1948
1948 establishments in Germany
Design companies disestablished in 1995
German companies disestablished in 1995
German companies established in 1948
Manufacturing companies based in Dresden